Owen Wesley Siler (January 10, 1922July 17, 2007) was a United States Coast Guard admiral who served as the 15th commandant from 1974 to 1978.

Early life and education
Siler was born in Seattle, Washington and grew up in Santa Maria, California where he attended Santa Maria High School. He graduated from Santa Maria Junior College (now Allan Hancock College) in 1940, and transferred to the United States Coast Guard Academy in New London, Connecticut, graduating a year early due to World War II. Upon graduation, he was assigned to the assault troop transport ship, and participated in the invasion of Bougainville. Siler received a Master of Science degree in international affairs from George Washington University's Elliott School of International Affairs in 1968.

Career
During World War II, Siler quickly advanced through the ranks, serving as a gunnery officer, assistant navigator, and deck watch officer. In the immediate aftermath of the war, he participated in the U.S. occupation of Northern Honshū, Japan.

His career with the U.S. Coast Guard included serving as a deck officer afloat, as an aviator performing search and rescue patrols, and ashore in the law enforcement, marine safety and environmental protection fields.  Other assignments included chief of the search and rescue branch in Juneau, Alaska, deputy chief of staff in Washington, and commanding officer at Air Station Miami, where the station received a Coast Guard unit commendation for Cuban exodus operations during October and November 1965.

From 1971 until his appointment as commandant, he served as commander of the St. Louis-based 2nd Coast Guard District.

During Siler's tenure as commandant he instituted a minority recruiting program and was instrumental in having women admitted to the U.S. Coast Guard Academy, making it the first of the military service academies to do so. He also oversaw the expansion of the U.S. Coast Guard's marine environmental protection program, with the passage of the Fisheries Conservation and Management Act of 1976, which included an increase of the service's jurisdiction along the U.S. coastline to more than two million square miles.

Siler was the last World War II veteran to serve as commandant.

Dates of rank

Awards and decorations

Later life and death
Following his retirement from the U.S. Coast Guard, Siler moved to Savannah, Georgia, where he died from complications of heart failure on July 17, 2007, at the age of 85, and is buried in Arlington National Cemetery.

References

External links

Official Coast Guard Biography

1922 births
2007 deaths
Burials at Arlington National Cemetery
Commandants of the United States Coast Guard
United States Coast Guard admirals
Allan Hancock College alumni
Elliott School of International Affairs alumni
United States Coast Guard Aviation
United States Coast Guard Academy alumni
United States Coast Guard personnel of World War II
Recipients of the Legion of Merit
Military personnel from Seattle
Military personnel from Savannah, Georgia
Military personnel from California
People from Santa Maria, California